

England

Head coach: Brian Ashton
 Iain Balshaw
 Mike Catt
 George Chuter
 Martin Corry
 Mark Cueto
 Louis Deacon
 Nick Easter
 Harry Ellis
 Andy Farrell
 Toby Flood
 Perry Freshwater
 Shane Geraghty
 Danny Grewcock
 James Haskell
 Josh Lewsey
 Magnus Lund
 Lee Mears
 Olly Morgan
 Jamie Noon
 Tom Palmer
 Tim Payne
 Shaun Perry
 Tom Rees
 Peter Richards
 Jason Robinson
 David Strettle
 Mathew Tait
 Mike Tindall
 Stuart Turner
 Phil Vickery
 Julian White
 Jonny Wilkinson
 Joe Worsley

France

Head coach: Bernard Laporte

 Benoît August
 Lionel Beauxis
 Serge Betsen
 Julien Bonnaire
 Sébastien Bruno
 Sébastien Chabal
 Vincent Clerc
 Pieter de Villiers
 Christophe Dominici
 Jean-Baptiste Élissalde
 Florian Fritz
 Imanol Harinordoquy
 Cédric Heymans
 Raphaël Ibañez
 Yannick Jauzion
 Gregory Lamboley
 Sylvain Marconnet
 David Marty
 Nicolas Mas
 Pierre Mignoni
 Olivier Milloud
 Lionel Nallet
 Pascal Papé
 Clément Poitrenaud
 Aurélien Rougerie
 David Skrela
 Dimitri Szarzewski
 Jérôme Thion
 Damien Traille
 Elvis Vermeulen
 Dimitri Yachvili

Ireland

Head coach: Eddie O'Sullivan

 Neil Best
 Rory Best
 Simon Best
 Isaac Boss
 Gordon D'Arcy
 Girvan Dempsey
 Simon Easterby
 Jerry Flannery
 John Hayes
 Denis Hickie
 Trevor Hogan
 Marcus Horan
 Shane Horgan
 Denis Leamy
 Geordan Murphy
 Donncha O'Callaghan
 Paul O'Connell
 Brian O'Driscoll
 Mick O'Driscoll
 Ronan O'Gara
 Eoin Reddan
 Peter Stringer
 Andrew Trimble
 David Wallace
 Paddy Wallace
 Bryan Young

Italy

Head coach:  Pierre Berbizier

 Matteo Barbini
 Mauro Bergamasco
 Mirco Bergamasco
 Valerio Bernabò
 Marco Bortolami
 Gonzalo Canale
 Martin Castrogiovanni
 Denis Dallan
 Roland de Marigny
 Santiago Dellapè
 Carlo Festuccia
 Ezio Galon
 Leonardo Ghiraldini
 Paul Griffen
 Andrea Lo Cicero
 Roberto Mandelli
 Andrea Masi
 Carlos Nieto
 Fabio Ongaro
 Sergio Parisse
 Salvatore Perugini
 Ramiro Pez
 Matteo Pratichetti
 Kaine Robertson
 Andrea Scanavacca
 Josh Sole
 Fabio Staibano
 Alessandro Troncon
 Maurizio Zaffiri
 Alessandro Zanni

Scotland

Head coach: Frank Hadden

 Johnnie Beattie
 Kelly Brown
 Dave Callam
 Chris Cusiter
 Rob Dewey
 Marcus Di Rollo
 Ross Ford
 Phil Godman
 Dougie Hall
 Jim Hamilton
 Andrew Henderson
 Nathan Hines
 Allister Hogg
 Allan Jacobsen
 Alastair Kellock
 Gavin Kerr
 Rory Lamont
 Sean Lamont
 Rory Lawson
 Euan Murray
 Scott Murray
 Dan Parks
 Chris Paterson
 Hugo Southwell
 Simon Taylor
 Nikki Walker
 Simon Webster

Wales

Head coach: Gareth Jenkins

 Aled Brew
 Lee Byrne
 Brent Cockbain
 Chris Czekaj
 Ian Gough
 James Hook
 Chris Horsman
 Gethin Jenkins
 Adam Jones
 Alun Wyn Jones
 Duncan Jones
 Mark Jones
 Ryan Jones
 Stephen Jones
 Hal Luscombe
 Kevin Morgan
 Dwayne Peel
 Mike Phillips
 Alix Popham
 Matthew Rees
 Jamie Robinson
 Tom Shanklin
 Robert Sidoli
 Ceri Sweeney
 Gareth Thomas
 Gavin Thomas
 Jonathan Thomas
 T. Rhys Thomas
 Martyn Williams
 Shane Williams

Notes and references
RBS Six Nations Squads

2007
2007 Six Nations Championship